Visolaje is a village and municipality in the Púchov District, Trenčín Region of Slovakia. As of 2004, it had 947 inhabitants. The village lies near the major D1 motorway from Bratislava to Žilina

The Church of St. Gallus in the village dates from the 14th century. The first scriptural note is from year 1327.

References

External links 
 
 

Villages and municipalities in Púchov District